Frank Haege (born October 11, 1968) is an American football coach. He served as the head football coach at Augsburg University in Minneapolis, compiling a record of 57–93. Haege was also the head coach for the Quad City Steamwheelers of AF2 from 2000 to 2001 and the New Jersey Gladiators the Arena Football League from 2002 to 2004.

Arena football
While in the Arena Football League, he was an assistant coach for the Milwaukee Mustangs in 1994, the Minnesota Fighting Pike in 1996, and the New Jersey Red Dogs from 1997 through 1999. In 2000, Haege became the head coach of the Quad City Steamwheelers of the af2, which is the Arena Football League's developmental league. In his two seasons as head coach of the Steamwheelers, they compiled a 37–1 record and won back to back ArenaCup championships. In 2002, Haege left the Steamwheelers to become the head coach of the New Jersey Gladiators (later the Las Vegas Gladiators) of the Arena Football League. Haege set an AFL record for best turnaround of an AFL team. He took over a 2–12 (2001) team and lead them to a record of 9–5 in 2002. The 2002 Gladiators also made it to the second round of the AFL playoffs. The Gladiators went 8–8 and made the playoffs in 2003. They also went 8–8 in 2004.

College football
Haege spent four years as an assistant football coach at Bemidji State University from 1992 to 1995, and was the offensive coordinator from 1996 to 1998 at Augsburg University in Minneapolis. Haege became head coach of Augsburg in 2005 and remained the head coach through the end of the 2019 season, compiling a record of 57–93. In 2020, Haege became the first recreation director in Tiffin, Iowa.

Family
A native of Virginia, Minnesota, Haege is the son of football coach Art Haege, who is known for his time with the Iowa Barnstormers of the Arena Football League. Haege and his wife, Michele, have three sons, Frank Jr., M. J. and A. J.

Head coaching record

College

References

External links
 Augsburg profile
 AFL coaching stats

1968 births
Living people
American football tight ends
Augsburg Auggies football coaches
Bemidji State Beavers football coaches
Cleveland Gladiators coaches
Milwaukee Mustangs (1994–2001) coaches
Minnesota Fighting Pike coaches
Quad City Steamwheelers coaches
Wisconsin–Stout Blue Devils football players
People from Two Rivers, Wisconsin
People from Virginia, Minnesota
Coaches of American football from  Minnesota
Players of American football from  Minnesota